Marple Aqueduct (also known as Goyt Aqueduct) at Marple, Greater Manchester, in north-west England was built to carry the lower level of the Peak Forest Canal across the River Goyt (treated as part of the River Mersey until 1896).

The company's engineer, Benjamin Outram, was responsible for the design and Thomas Brown, the resident engineer, for its construction. The construction contract was placed with William Broadhead, Bethel Furness and William Anderson in 1795. Furness died later in 1795, so the aqueduct was completed by the remaining partners in 1799, but not brought into use until 1800. Seven men lost their lives during its construction.

It is the highest canal aqueduct in England and the highest masonry-arch aqueduct in Britain. It contains some 8,000 cubic yards (6,000 m³)  of masonry. The lower parts are of red sandstone from the nearby Hyde Bank quarry. The upper parts are of white stone from a quarry at Chapel Milton. The abutments widen in well-proportioned curves and batter or diminish upwards in the same manner. The skilful use of architectural features, such as the circular piercing of the spandrels, string courses, arch rings and pilasters of ashlar stone, oval piers and stone of different type and colour have created a graceful structure, which is superlative in its class.

In 1860, damage caused by repeated frost heave after water leaked through the puddling of the trough had to be urgently repaired by Charles Sacré, chief engineer of the Manchester, Sheffield and Lincolnshire Railway, which then owned the canal. He tied together the two faces above the central arch by 2-inch bolts through the structure, secured by the plates that can still be seen. A hundred years later, a similar problem was ignored by British Waterways (BW) and on the night of 9 January 1962 the outer face of the north-east arch collapsed. BW, supported by the Ministry of Transport, thought that it would be "a complete waste of money" to do other than demolish the aqueduct and formally close the lower Peak Forest and Ashton Canals. However, it was saved by the intervention of Geoffrey Rippon, the Minister of Public Buildings and Works, who facilitated an agreement whereby a sympathetic Cheshire County Council funded the extra cost of full restoration, over and above what it would have cost BW to demolish it, under the terms of the Local Authorities (Historic Buildings) Act 1962, which Rippon himself had steered through Parliament. The main contractor for the restoration was Harry Fairclough Ltd of Warrington, with Rendel, Palmer & Tritton as the consulting engineers.

The aqueduct was scheduled as an ancient monument soon afterwards and was Grade I listed in 1966. For many years, its picturesque setting in the Goyt valley was obscured by the uncontrolled growth of self-set trees. These have now been cut back to restore the view.

See also

Grade I listed buildings in Greater Manchester
Listed buildings in Marple, Greater Manchester
List of canal aqueducts in Great Britain
Scheduled Monuments in Greater Manchester

Photo gallery

References

Grahame Boyes and Brian Lamb, (2012) The Peak Forest Canal and Railway: an engineering and business history, Derby: Railway & Canal Historical Society 

Bridges in Greater Manchester
Buildings and structures in the Metropolitan Borough of Stockport
Bridges completed in 1800
Navigable aqueducts in England
Grade I listed buildings in Greater Manchester
Marple, Greater Manchester